The Sony E 18-200mm F3.5-6.3 OSS LE is a variable maximum aperture superzoom lens for the Sony E-mount, released by Sony on May 17, 2012. The lens was designed to better accommodate users of Sony's E-mount mirrorless cameras in weight and size.

Build quality
The lens features an all-plastic construction with rubber focus and zoom rings. The barrel of the lens telescopes outward from the main lens body as it's zoomed in from 18mm to 200mm. To combat zoom creep, the lens features a small zoom lock switch on the main lens barrel.

Optics
The lens features an entirely new optical formula. The Tamron 18-200mm F/3.5-6.3 Di III VC is "nearly identical".

Compared to its predecessor (the Sony E 18-200mm F3.5-6.3 OSS), this lens is softer and suffers from greater chromatic aberration. However, distortion has been reduced in the new design.

See also
List of Sony E-mount lenses
Sony E 18-200mm F3.5-6.3 OSS

References

Camera lenses introduced in 2012
18-200
Superzoom lenses